Mancora may refer to:
Máncora, a beach town in Peru
Máncora District in Peru
Mancora (2008), a Peruvian film